Mount Stanley is a rural locality in the Somerset Region, Queensland, Australia. In the  Mount Stanley had a population of 7 people.

Geography 
The locality is loosely bounded to the west and north by the Brisbane Range.

Mount Stanley has the following mountains:
 Mount Stanley  in the south-east of the locality.

The east branch of Brisbane River flows from the north-east of the locality through to the south of locality. Mount Stanley is often described as the source of the Brisbane River.

History 
The locality may take its name from the mountain Mount Stanley. Alternately, it may take its name from the pastoral leases called Mount Stanley. 

Mount Stanley East and Mount Stanley West were two of the six leases that comprised the pastoral run of Colinton which was "bounded on the north by a marked tree beyond Mount Stanley".  Colinton was taken up by the Balfour brothers (John, Charles and Robert) in 1841.

In the  Mount Stanley had a population of 7 people.

On 1 February 2018, Mount Stanley's postcode changed from 4306 to 4314.

Education 
There are no schools in Mount Stanley. The nearest primary schools are Linville State School in Linville to the south, Nanango State School in Nanango to the south-west, Moffatdale State School in Moffatdale to the north-west, and Mary Valley College in Imbil to the north-east. The nearest secondary schools are Nanango State High School (to Year 12) in Nanango to the south-west, Toogoolawah State High School in Toogoolawah to the south, and Mary Valley College (to Year 10 only) in Imbil to the north-east.

References 

Suburbs of Somerset Region
Localities in Queensland